Paul Dillett (1965 in Montreal, Quebec) is a retired Canadian IFBB professional bodybuilder and current owner and CEO of the World Beauty Fitness & Fashion Inc. He resides in Toronto, Ontario, Canada.

Biography
Paul Dillett was born in Montreal to a French father and Jamaican mother. Before bodybuilding, Dillett played in the Canadian Football League. Dillett first competed in professional bodybuilding when he took second place in the heavyweight division of the 1991 North American Championships. His first Mr. Olympia was in 1993, where he placed 6th. In 1993, he competed in his first Ironman Pro Invitational, where he took fourth place.

Later that year, he competed in his first Arnold Classic, placing fourth. In 1999, he competed in the Night of Champions competition, where he placed first. Paul has been featured in many fitness and bodybuilding articles, including being featured on the cover of Muscular Development magazine.

At the Arnold Classic in 1994, Dillett "froze" on stage, a result of cramping from dehydration, and four officials had to carry him off the stage.
He ended his professional bodybuilding career in 2012. It is conventional wisdom within the industry that while being a genetically gifted athlete of enormous size, Dillett never truly mastered his posing routines, which prevented him from placing higher in contests throughout his career.

Dillett founded the World Beauty Fitness & Fashion Competition (WBFF) in 2007. The competition judges one's overall beauty and marketability. This includes stage presence not just physique. Amateurs and professional contestants, compete in a number of different categories including men's Bodybuilding Pro, Muscle Model, Fitness Model, women's Figure Pro, Diva Fitness Model, and Diva Bikini Model.

Stats
 Height:  
 Off Season Weight: 
 Competition Weight:

Contest history
1991 North American Championships, Heavyweight, 2nd
1992 North American Championships, Heavyweight, 1st and Overall
1993 Arnold Classic, 4th
1993 Ironman Pro Invitational, 4th
1993 Mr. Olympia, 6th
1994 Grand Prix England, 4th
1994 Grand Prix France (2), 2nd
1994 Grand Prix France, 1st
1994 Grand Prix Germany (2), 1st
1994 Grand Prix Germany, 3rd
1994 Grand Prix Italy, 2nd
1994 Grand Prix Spain, 3rd
1994 Mr. Olympia, 4th
1996 Arnold Classic, 3rd
1996 Grand Prix Czech Republic, 3rd
1996 Grand Prix England, 3rd
1996 Grand Prix Germany, 4th
1996 Grand Prix Russia, 4th
1996 Grand Prix Spain, 2nd
1996 Grand Prix Switzerland, 2nd
1996 Ironman Pro Invitational, 2nd
1996 Mr. Olympia, 5th
1996 San Jose Pro Invitational, 2nd
1997 Arnold Classic, 6th
1997 Grand Prix Czech Republic, 6th
1997 Grand Prix England, 4th
1997 Grand Prix Finland, 5th
1997 Grand Prix Germany, 4th
1997 Grand Prix Hungary, 4th
1997 Grand Prix Russia, 5th
1997 Grand Prix Spain, 4th
1997 Ironman Pro Invitational, 5th
1997 Mr. Olympia, 5th
1997 San Jose Pro Invitational, 5th
1998 Mr. Olympia, Did not place
1999 Night of Champions, 1st
1999 Mr. Olympia, 7th
2000 Night of Champions, 3rd
2002 Night of Champions, 6th
2002 Southwest Pro Cup, 8th
2003 Grand Prix Hungary, 14th
2006 Montreal Pro, 10th

See also
List of male professional bodybuilders
List of female professional bodybuilders

References

External links
 Paul Dillett Gallery

Professional bodybuilders
1965 births
Canadian bodybuilders
Sportspeople from Montreal
Living people

Canadian people of French descent
Canadian people of Jamaican descent